"Everybody Needs a 303" is the debut single by British big beat artist Fatboy Slim, released in 1996 from his debut album Better Living Through Chemistry. The original version of the single peaked at number 191 on the UK Singles Chart. The song was remixed as "Everybody Loves a Carnival" and released as a single; this version became more commercially successful than its original version, peaking at number 34 on the UK Singles Chart.

Song information
The title refers to the TB-303 synthesizer. The song samples Edwin Starr's "Everybody Needs Love". It was featured on the Lost in Space soundtrack.

Track listing
 CD1
 "Everybody Needs a 303" (Original Radio Edit)
 "Everybody Needs a 303"
 "Everybody Loves a Carnival"
 "Neal Cassady Starts Here"
 CD2
 "Everybody Loves a Carnival" (Radio Edit)
 "Everybody Loves a Filter"
 "Es Paradis"
 "Where You're At"
 12"
 "Everybody Needs a 303"
 "Lincoln Memorial"
 "We Want to See Those Fingers"

Charts

References

1996 songs
1996 debut singles
1997 singles
Fatboy Slim songs
Songs written by Norman Cook
Skint Records singles